Joel Benenson (born July 24, 1952) is an American pollster and consultant known for his role as a strategist for Barack Obama's 2008 and 2012 presidential campaigns. He was the chief strategist for Hillary Clinton's  2016 presidential campaign.

Early life 
Benenson was born in New York City to a Jewish family. He grew up in Laurelton, Queens and Manhattan with his family. He attended Andrew Jackson High School in the late 1960s. Benenson is a Queens College graduate.

Career 
He is the CEO of Benenson Strategy Group, a strategic consulting firm, and served as a communications and polling advisor to the White House for Barack Obama. He has been a strategist for U.S. senators, governors and mayors, as well as Fortune 500 companies. He was a pollster for the DCCC in 2006, when the Democrats won back the majority in the House of Representatives.

In 1995, he worked as a Political Journalist for the Daily News in New York and served as Communications Director for Governor Mario Cuomo’s 1994 campaign. He was previously a vice president at the New York ad agency FCB.

Benenson has served as a consultant to American companies and CEOs, including Procter & Gamble’s A.G. Lafley, General Electric’s Jack Welch and AOL’s Bob Pittman. He has helped corporate clients. He was a strategic researcher for Procter & Gamble's launch of Olestra, the fat substitute; he helped AOL manage its capacity crisis in the late 1990s and a New York City coalition block Mayor Michael Bloomberg’s plans for an Olympic stadium in Manhattan.

Benenson is also the co-founder of iModerate Research Technologies.

In January 2015, Hillary Clinton hired Benenson and Robby Mook as strategists.

The Israeli Blue and White political alliance appointed Benenson as its strategist for the September 2019 Israeli legislative election.

References

External links 
 Benenson Strategy Group
 

1952 births
20th-century American Jews
American political consultants
Hillary Clinton
Hillary Clinton 2016 presidential campaign
Living people
New York (state) Democrats
People from Laurelton, Queens
Political campaign staff
Pollsters
Queens College, City University of New York alumni
People from Manhattan
Andrew Jackson High School (Queens) alumni
American chief executives
21st-century American Jews